Jarett Park (born October 25, 1982) is a professional lacrosse player from Otisco, New York.  He currently plays for the Colorado Mammoth in the National Lacrosse League, and the Washington Bayhawks of Major League Lacrosse.

College career
Park is a graduate of Syracuse University, where he was a two-sport athlete.  A midfielder on the lacrosse team, leading the team in groundballs in all four seasons, he helped them win two NCAA Men's Lacrosse Championships in 2002 and 2004.  Park also played on the Orangemen soccer team. As a freshman, he was awarded the Big East Rookie of the Year and led the nation in assists per game.  In 2001 he was named College Men's Freshman of the Year by Soccer America magazine.  As a junior, he garnered All-Big East recognition.  As a senior, Park did not play soccer, instead deciding to focus on lacrosse.

Professional career
Park's professional career started in 2005 with the Boston Cannons of the Major League Lacrosse, where he was twice named Rookie of the Week.  Following his rookie season, he was traded to the expansion San Francisco Dragons.  In both 2006 and 2007, he finished with the team's second highest groundball totals. During the 2008 MLL season, Park was traded to the Washington Bayhawks.

In the 2006 NLL season, Park played with the San Jose Stealth of the National Lacrosse League.  Following the season, he was acquired by the New York Titans in the 2006 NLL expansion draft.  In 2007, he led the team in groundballs with 129, good for eighth in the league.  In 2008, he was awarded Week 7 "Transition Player of the Week" honors, and was also named to the National Lacrosse League All-Star Game. During the 2009 NLL season, he was again named to the All-Star Game as an injury replacement.

When the Titans moved to Orlando, Park went with them, playing one more season with the team before they disbanded. He was chosen by the Colorado Mammoth in the dispersal draft.

Statistics

NLL

References

1982 births
Living people
American lacrosse players
Syracuse Orange men's lacrosse players
Major League Lacrosse players
San Jose Stealth players
New York Titans (lacrosse) players
Orlando Titans players
Colorado Mammoth players
National Lacrosse League All-Stars
People from Otisco, New York